Franck Jonot (born 1 April 1961) is a French hurdler. He competed in the men's 400 metres hurdles at the 1984 Summer Olympics.

References

External links
 

1961 births
Living people
Athletes (track and field) at the 1984 Summer Olympics
French male hurdlers
Olympic athletes of France
Place of birth missing (living people)
20th-century French people
21st-century French people